Ramuntcho is an 1897 novel by French author Pierre Loti.

Ramuntcho may also refer to:

 Ramuntcho (1919 film)
 Ramuntcho (1938 film)
 Ramuntcho (1959 film)
 Ramuntcho (Pierné)